is a 1951 Japanese drama film directed by Kenji Mizoguchi. It is based on the novel by Shōhei Ōoka.

Plot
Michiko Akiyama is married to Tadao Akiyama, a college professor but a vulgar man with a lower-class background. Towards the end of World War II, they flee the bombing of Tokyo for her parents' estate in the suburban Musashino. Her cousin Eiji Ono, a wartime profiteer with loose morals, and his wife Tomiko live near-by. When her parents die, Michiko inherits the estate. After the end of the war, the extended family is joined by the young and handsome Tsutomu Miyaji, another cousin of hers and former prisoner of war. 

Tadao comes home drunk every night, has sexual relationships with students, and also propositions Tomiko. Tomiko, unhappy in her marriage, craves for Tsutomu, as does Michiko. Yet Michiko resists Tsutomu's advances because she is married and does not want him to fall prey to permissiveness. However, when she learns of her husband's plans to swindle her out of her inheritance and run off with Tomiko, she decides to commit suicide to frustrate Tadao's theft, leaving most of her estate to Tsutomu.

Cast
 Kinuyo Tanaka as Michiko Akiyama
 Yukiko Todoroki as Tomiko Ono
 Masayuki Mori as Tadao Akiyama
 Akihito Katayama as Tsutomu Miyaji
 Sō Yamamura as Eiji Ono
 Eitarō Shindō as Shinzaburo Miyaji
 Kiyoko Hirai as Tamiko Miyaji
 Minako Nakamura as Yukiko Ono
 Noriko Sengoku as Maid in the Ono house

Home media
A DVD of the film was released in the UK by Artificial Eye in 2004.

References

External links
 

1951 drama films
1950s Japanese-language films
Toho films
Films based on works by Shōhei Ōoka
Films directed by Kenji Mizoguchi
Films with screenplays by Yoshikata Yoda
Films scored by Fumio Hayasaka
Films based on Japanese novels
Japanese drama films
Japanese black-and-white films
1950s Japanese films